CKEE-FM is a Canadian radio station broadcasting at 101.5 FM in Whistler, British Columbia, British Columbia with a modern adult contemporary/classic rock format branded on-air as 101.5 Whistler FM.

History
Owned by Four Senses Entertainment Inc., the station was licensed by the CRTC on March 2, 2009. On February 25, 2013, CKEE-FM began broadcasting.

References

External links
101.5 Whistler FM
 

KEE
KEE
Radio stations established in 2013
2013 establishments in British Columbia
Whistler, British Columbia